Amaxia perapyga is a moth of the family Erebidae. It was described by Walter Rothschild in 1922. It is found in Brazil.

Subspecies
Amaxia perapyga perapyga
Amaxia perapyga semivitrea Rothschild, 1922

References

Moths described in 1922
Amaxia
Moths of South America